Fulhadhoo (Dhivehi: ފުޅަދޫ) is one of the inhabited islands of Southern Maalhosmadulhu Atoll, code letter "Baa", in Maldives.

Geography

Horsburgh Atoll
This island lies in a small separate atoll along with Goidhu and Fehendhu, as well as four smaller uninhabited islets . Goidhoo Atoll (also Goidu or Goifulhafehendhu), Horsburgh Atoll in the Admiralty Chart, is separated from South Maalhosmadulhu by a  broad channel. This atoll is oval in shape and small, its greatest length being . Unlike the lagoons of most small atolls of the Maldives, this lagoon is free from coral heads in its centre.

In the Admiralty Charts, this atoll is named after James Horsburgh, hydrographer to the East India Company and author of the "Directions for Sailing to and from the East Indies, China, New Holland, Cape of Good Hope, and the interjacent Ports, compiled chiefly from original Journals and Observations made during 21 years' experience in navigating those Seas".

Demography

See also
James Horsburgh

References

 Divehiraajjege Jōgrafīge Vanavaru. Muhammadu Ibrahim Lutfee. G.Sōsanī.
 Xavier Romero-Frias, The Maldive Islanders, A Study of the Popular Culture of an Ancient Ocean Kingdom. Barcelona 1999.

Islands of the Maldives